Andy Williams recorded 43 studio albums, 17 of which (along with the 1970 compilation Andy Williams' Greatest Hits) received Gold certification from the Recording Industry Association of America for selling 500,000 units. Three of those recipients went on to reach one million in sales, for which they were awarded Platinum certification. Between studio, Christmas, and compilation albums he had 37 entries on the pop albums chart in Billboard magazine with 12 of those making the top 10. One of those 12, his 1963 album Days of Wine and Roses and Other TV Requests, spent 16 weeks at number one and comes in at number five on the list of the top albums released in the 1960s in terms of Billboard chart performance.  During the 1960s and early 1970s two of his Platinum LPs, The Andy Williams Christmas Album and Merry Christmas, made annual appearances on the magazine's Christmas Albums chart, where they each reached the number one position in multiple holiday seasons. In a ranking of the top album artists of the 1960s in terms of Billboard chart performance, he comes in at number eight.

Williams also recorded 47 songs that reached Billboard magazine's Hot 100 chart in the United States and another eight that "bubbled under" the Hot 100. Nine of these 54 recordings made the top 10 (including 1957's "Butterfly", which spent three weeks at number one), and 32 of them are also on the list of 44 entries that Williams had on the magazine's Easy Listening chart, which was started in 1961. 19 of those 44 songs made the top 10 on that list, and four of them ("Can't Get Used to Losing You", "In the Arms of Love", "Happy Heart", and "(Where Do I Begin) Love Story") went on to number one. In a ranking of Billboard'''s top Adult Contemporary chart performers from 1961 to 1969, he comes in at number five.

In 1963 the Williams recording of "White Christmas" was released to promote The Andy Williams Christmas Album and spent the last five weeks of the year at number one on Billboards Christmas Singles chart. The album also included "It's the Most Wonderful Time of the Year", which was written for The Andy Williams Show and became a staple of his annual Christmas specials. Although covers of the song he originated by artists such as Garth Brooks and Harry Connick, Jr. had single chart runs in Billboard upon initial release, the recording by Williams enjoyed widespread popularity several decades after it debuted. Its first appearance on a weekly singles chart was in the UK in 2007, and his recording returned to the UK chart each holiday season for many years to follow, reaching a peak position at number 17 in 2017. When Billboard started its Holiday 100 chart in 2011, the Williams classic began annual appearances there and had its best showing in 2018 when it got as high as number two, and in 2016, after the magazine changed its Hot 100 rules regarding older songs, "Most" began returning there each December as well and also hit a high point during the 2020 holiday season when it reached number 5.

Since the British Phonographic Industry began its awards in 1973 Williams had 12 albums receive Silver certification for selling 60,000 units in the UK, and Six of those albums eventually sold the 100,000 units necessary for receiving Gold certification. On the UK album chart he had 30 entries with 11 of those making the top 10. He also had 24 recordings that reached the UK singles chart with nine of those reaching the top 10, including "Butterfly", which spent two weeks at number one.

 Label X and the Cadence years 

Williams's first recordings as a solo artist were done in two sessions for the RCA Victor subsidiary Label X in the mid-1950s. Two songs were recorded at the first session, "Groundhog" and "There Is a Time", but according to Williams, "Nothing came of this date.... The numbers are still on the shelf."  The four songs from the other session produced two singles: "Why Should I Cry Over You?"/"You Can't Buy Happiness" and "Now I Know"/"Here Comes That Dream Again". In 1967 Williams described something he learned in moving from RCA to Cadence Records in 1955: "I realized that what I had done for Label X wasn't the right kind of product -- in fact, the proof of this is that even years later, when I was selling big on Columbia, those sides were never reissued on RCA."

When Williams arrived at Cadence on December 1, 1955, label founder Archie Bleyer immediately had him record two holiday songs, "The Wind, the Sand and the Star" and "Christmas Is a Feeling in Your Heart".  But Williams explains in his autobiography that his new boss "didn't get the record released until a few days before Christmas" and that "it sold only 10,000 copies." His next single, however, included his first song to reach the Billboard Hot 100, "Walk Hand in Hand", and it became the first of half a dozen hits to be packaged together with their corresponding B-sides on his first compilation album, which was simply entitled Andy Williams.

For his first studio album Williams decided to pay tribute to the songwriting talent of his Tonight Show colleague Steve Allen because, he explains, "I thought that if I recorded an album of Steve's own compositions, he might let me sing one or two on the show." Allen, in fact, had Williams eventually perform the entire album on the show by having him sing a different song each night. Williams turned to the popular duo of Richard Rodgers and Oscar Hammerstein II for his second Cadence LP, which included songs from their Broadway musicals Carousel, The King and I, Oklahoma!, and South Pacific. Indeed, each of the long players he made for the label had its own specific focus, such as songs from Hawaii or France, and it was during this phase that he recorded Lonely Street, his first release to reach the pop albums chart in Billboard magazine.

The singles that Williams recorded for Cadence charted much more frequently. Of his 16 A-sides that made the Billboard Hot 100 and its predecessors during this period, 11 of them made it into the top forty positions on the chart, and six of those reached the top ten. Some of these hits fit in nicely with the ballads or what is now called the traditional pop format of many of his LPs at the time. In fact three of the more successful songs from this era ("The Hawaiian Wedding Song", "Lonely Street", and "The Village of St. Bernadette") inspired the themes of the albums on which they later appeared.  But several singles, including "Butterfly", "I Like Your Kind of Love", and "Lips of Wine", followed the burgeoning rock and roll trend. "Archie wasn't trying to turn me into a poor man's Elvis; he was just trying to find hit songs. If they were rock and roll, then he wanted them sung that way."

 The Columbia years 

Williams's move to Columbia Records in 1961 heralded the start of a highly successful series of albums produced by Robert Mersey that focused on standards, including many from stage and screen, with some Easy Listening hits of the day eventually becoming part of the formula. One of these projects, 1962's Moon River and Other Great Movie Themes, became his first album to reach the top 10 on Billboard'''s Top LPs chart and his earliest recording to receive Gold certification from the Recording Industry Association of America. His chart-topping Days of Wine and Roses and Other TV Requests (which included his number two pop hit "Can't Get Used to Losing You") also reached the half million mark in sales, as did the next five consecutive top 10 albums and two number one Christmas LPs on which Mersey also did much of the arranging and conducting.  His top 10 release from 1966, The Shadow of your Smile, featured covers of the Beatles songs "Michelle" and "Yesterday" and foreshadowed the shift that Williams would be making over the next few years toward contemporary material. His next LP, In the Arms of Love, peaked only as high as number 21, making it his lowest charting studio album with Columbia to date and helping to explain why it didn't sell enough to receive Gold certification. After 12 projects with Mersey at the helm, Williams moved on to work with producers that could accommodate his more modern aspirations.

He began his next string of Gold records in 1967 with Born Free, which relied exclusively on recent hits from the pop and Easy Listening charts and became the first of five more top 10 albums he would release. When Clive Davis became President of Columbia Records that same year, he paid close attention to the label's Easy Listening artists since most of them were experiencing a decline in sales. "Only Williams was really keeping current. He was open to the new, younger writers that were emerging." One of the musical directors of The Andy Williams Show, Jack Elliott, had made note of the singer's musical taste in 1967 as well: "Andy constantly wants to do new material. If anything, the only professional criticism I would have is that I think he reaches too hard for today's stuff." But in retrospect Davis takes on part of the responsibility for trying to appeal to young record buyers. "I urged Andy to include only the most well-known of contemporary songs in his albums. I had carefully studied the sales of his albums, and it was a matter of mathematics: sales increased in proportion to the number of identifiable titles on the album cover. It became almost a formula."

The formula also worked well in the United Kingdom, where his next LP, Love, Andy, reached number one, and even as Williams was not charting and selling in the US in the 1970s as he had been, the numbers across the Atlantic remained impressive. The 1970 Andy Williams' Greatest Hits compilation reached number 42 during its 20 weeks on Billboards list of the 200 Top LPs in America, but in the UK the album spent its first three weeks on their much smaller album chart at number 2 before eventually spending five of its 116 weeks there at number 1. His final top 10 LP in America, 1971's Love Story, went under the title Home Lovin' Man in the UK, where it reached number 1, and four more top 10 albums followed it onto the UK chart, including 1974's The Way We Were, which was the first of his 25 studio albums released by Columbia thus far that did not reach the Billboard charts. His popularity in the UK wasn't enough to sustain his relationship with Columbia much longer, and he recorded a few more albums that didn't receive wide attention before moving on.

The post-Columbia years 

In 1984, British record producers Tony Hiller and Nicky Graham enticed Williams back into the studio after a four-year hiatus to record Greatest Love Classics, a project in which the duo had written lyrics for selections of classical music. His next three albums revisited concepts with which he'd had varying degrees of success: movie songs on Close Enough for Love, Christmas music on I Still Believe in Santa Claus, and Country music on Nashville. In 1994 he released audio and video recordings of two concerts that were filmed at his Moon River Theater in Branson, Missouri. The CD Greatest Hits and corresponding video Andy Williams in Concert at Branson featured live performances of "Moon River", "Can't Get Used to Losing You", "Canadian Sunset", and many others, and The New Andy Williams Christmas Album and its video companion, The Andy Williams Christmas Show, offered many favorites from his holiday albums, including "White Christmas", on which he is joined by Lorrie Morgan and The Osmond Brothers. The following year he released an album of new holiday recordings entitled We Need a Little Christmas, which earned Williams his 18th and final RIAA-certified Gold album.  His next return to the studio wasn't until 2006, when he recorded I Don't Remember Ever Growing Up, which was released in the UK the following year.

Albums

Studio albums

Notes:

*A: this album was re-released as a HD remaster in 2019

Album reissues
Many of the albums that Williams recorded were originally available in the vinyl LP, 8-track tape, Reel-to-reel, and audio cassette formats but were later reissued on compact disc. With close to 80 minutes of space available on each disc, it was possible to combine two albums on one CD, and most Williams albums have been paired up and reissued in this format, as shown in the collapsed table below:

 title of UK version

Compilation albums

Several Williams compilations are noteworthy for either their chart success, as noted by 27 of them listed below, or the material included. For example, Williams himself selected the songs included on Moon River: The Very Best of Andy Williams.

Live albums
Two Williams concerts in 1993 became his first domestic releases of live material:

Additional compilations
16 Most Requested Songs (1986), Columbia
Collection: Andy Williams (1987), CBS U.K.
Portrait of a song stylist: Andy Williams (1989), Master piece Music
Moon River (1990/1995/2002), CBS/Sony/Collectables
Unchained Melody (1990/2011), Curb
The Best of Andy Williams (1991), Curb
Andy Williams: Best Collection (1991), Sony Music Japan
Sings Songs of love (1992), GSC Music
Blue Hawaii, Greatest Songs of the Island (1992), Curb
Songs of Faith (1993), Sony Music Special Products
The Way We Were (1993), Sony Music Special Products
Essence of Andy Williams (1993), Columbia/Legacy
Andy Williams: Great songs of the sixties (1993), Sony Music U.K.
Wedding & Anniversary album (1994), Sony Music U.K.
A World of Love (1995), Music Club
His Greatest Hits and Finest Performances (1995), Reader's Digest
I Like Your Kind of Love  (1996), Varease Sarabande
Best of Andy Williams (1997), Columbia
Andy Williams: A Touch of Class (1997), Disky
Andy Williams: The Cadence Collection (1998), Snapper Music
Songs for Christmas (1998/2001), Sony Music Distribution
Christmas Album (1999), Columbia Records/Sony Music UK
Sings the Ballads (1999), Music Club
16 Biggest Hits (2000), Columbia/Legacy
Super Hits (2001), Legacy/Sony Music Distribution
The Complete Columbia Chart Singles Collection (2002), Taragon
25 All-Time Greatest Hits 1956–1961: The Cadence Years (2002), Varèse Sarabande
Classic Masters (2003), Capitol
The Best of the 70s (2004), Sony/BMG
Love Songs (2004), Columbia/Legacy
This Is Gold (2004), Disky
Very Best of Love (2004), Madacy
Straight From the Heart (2005), Music Club
Happy Heart: The Best of Andy Williams (2009), Sony UK
100 Hits Legends: Andy Williams (2009), Demon Music Group
Songs I Never Recorded (2010), Barnaby
Great Hit Sounds: I Like Your Kind of Love (2011), Jasmine
Very Best of Andy Williams(Playlist) (2013), Columbia/Legacy
Andy Williams Swings: Great American Songbook (2013), Performance
Complete Singles A's & B's :1954-1962 (2017), Acrobat
Emperor of Easy: Lost Columbia Masters 1962–1972 (2020), Real Gone Music

Album collaboration

The Williams Brothers Christmas Album (1971), Barnaby

Album narration
It's a Wonderful Christmas (1997), Publishing Mills

Box sets
Classic Album Collection, Vol. 1 (2001), Collectables
Classic Album Collection, Vol. 2 (2002), Collectables
Icons (2010), Sony UK

Radio broadcasts
 National Guard Shows (2010), Sounds of Yesteryear

Soundtrack compilations
These releases are composed of performances taken from The Andy Williams Show:

Andy Williams Live: Treasures from His Personal Collection (2001), Neon Tonic/Concord
Andy Williams Live: Christmas Treasures (2001), Neon Tonic/Concord

Singles

With Kay Thompson & the Williams Brothers (Columbia) (1948)

First solo singles (Label X) (1954–1955)

Cadence singles (1955–1961)

Columbia singles (1961–1981)

Holiday 100 chart entries
Since many radio stations in the US adopt a format change to Christmas music each December, many holiday hits have an annual spike in popularity during the last few weeks of the year and are retired once the season is over. In December 2011, Billboard began a Holiday 100 chart to "rank the top holiday hits of all eras using the same methodology as the Hot 100, blending streaming, airplay, and sales data." A handful of Williams recordings have made appearances on the Holiday 100 and are noted below according to the holiday season in which they charted there.

"It's the Most Wonderful Time of the Year"
The list of the "Top 10 Holiday Songs (Since 2001)" that was published by Billboard in 2009 ranked "It’s the Most Wonderful Time of the Year" at number five, and on the 2010 countdown of holiday songs receiving the most radio airplay as determined by the American Society of Composers, Authors and Publishers (ASCAP) the Williams classic came in at number four. In addition to its annual appearance on the Holiday 100, the original recording has also begun to show up on the pop singles charts for other countries and gave Williams his first top 10 pop hit in the US since 1971's "(Where Do I Begin) Love Story" when it reached number 10 on the Hot 100 in 2018. It also received Silver certification in the UK in 2016 and Gold certification there two years later. In 2019, it received Platinum certification and in 2022, double platinum. In December 2021 it received Platinum certification from ARIA in Australia.

Notes

References

External links

Williams, Andy